In mathematics, the T(1) theorem, first proved by , describes when an operator T given by a  kernel can be extended to  a bounded linear operator on the Hilbert space L2(Rn). The name T(1) theorem refers to a condition on the distribution T(1), given by the operator T applied to the function 1.

Statement

Suppose that T is a continuous operator from Schwartz functions on Rn to tempered distributions, so that T is given by a kernel K which is a distribution. Assume that the kernel is standard, which means that off the diagonal it is given by a function satisfying certain conditions. 
Then the T(1) theorem states that T can be extended to a bounded operator on the Hilbert space L2(Rn) if and only if the following conditions are satisfied:
T(1) is of bounded mean oscillation (where T is extended to an operator on bounded smooth functions, such as 1).
T*(1) is of bounded mean oscillation, where T* is the adjoint of T.
T is weakly bounded, a weak condition that is easy to verify in practice.

References

Theorems in functional analysis